Richard L. Shriner is the medical director of UF&Shands Vista Psychiatric Hospital in Gainesville, Florida. He is double boarded in both Internal Medicine and Psychiatry and has privileges in both psychiatry and internal medicine at the University of Florida. He has created many patient care programs along with physician care networks involving surgery, medicine, psychiatry, psychology, and nursing.

He has over 25 years of clinical experience as a medical psychiatrist. He has been the chairman of a department of psychiatry, has experience in education, and is the author of research articles and chapters in text books . He also heads the 'Living with Food' program at UF which helps people struggling with obesity who need help and who may even be addicted to food.

He writes a monthly article for the Gainesville Today Magazine.

Education 
 Medical Degree from Indiana University
 Psychiatry Residency at The Institute of Living at Hartford Hospital
 Internal Medicine Residency at the Institute of Living at Hartford Hospital
 Fellowship in Medical Psychiatry at Brown University

References 
 Dr. Shriner: UF advances work on national obesity epidemic
 'Living with Food' article - "Why Bariatric Surgery may Fail" September 2011
 'Living with Food' article - "Gastric Bypass: Do you want to pass or buy?" August 2011
 'Living with Food' article - "Gaining Weight? Maybe “It’s My Turn” Disease" July 2011
 'Living with Food' article - Food Addiction & The Fear of Intimacy June 2011

American psychiatrists
Living people
Year of birth missing (living people)